Jaeger Table is the ice-covered summit plateau of Dufek Massif, in the Pensacola Mountains of Antarctica, rising to  at Worcester Summit. The plateau was mapped by the United States Geological Survey (USGS) in 1968 from ground surveys and U.S. Navy aerial photographs taken 1964. It was named by the Advisory Committee on Antarctic Names, at the suggestion of USGS geologist Arthur B. Ford, after Commander James W. Jaeger, U.S. Navy, pilot of the Squadron VXE-6 Lockheed Hercules aircraft that landed the USGS field party in the area in the 1976–77 season.

References

Plateaus of Antarctica
Landforms of Queen Elizabeth Land